Pouria Alami (born on 23 February 1983 in Tehran) is an Iranian writer, satirist, journalist and writer of children's books. He is best known for his satirical columns in Iranian newspapers during the decades of 2000s and 2010s. The Coachman (Canapeh-chi), The Elevatorman (Asansor-chi) and The Adventures of Midoon and Sophia are some of his most popular columns which are later on published in book formats, too. In addition, he has published some collections of short stories and poems in Iran.

Alami said farewell to the world of journalism in 2019. He has continued his cultural activities as a writer of children's books in iGhesseh (iGhe3) Startup, and also as editor-in-chief in Radio Gousheh.

Professional life 
Alami did not continue his studies after graduating from high school. While he was a high school student, he worked as a librarian in the public library of Shahryar and the culture house of Shahrak Andisheh. He started writing for magazines such as Nourooz and Gol-Agha during these years.

In 2003, he designed and published his first mind game named Red Riding Hood, which was a combination of comic-strip, story-telling, game-map and story book, illustrated by Bozorgmehr Hosseinpour. At the same time, he was working as layout designer of Gol-Agha monthly and then art manager of a number of magazines and newspapers.

He self-published his first book, Half an Hour Before Seven in Tehran, and then became the writer, head of writers and the editor-in-chief in cultural radio programs of Radio Tehran until 2009.

An overview of Tahmasb's collection by Pouria Alami is published in the book: Three Tales by Iraj Tahmasb.

Activity in the press 
In the same year, he started writing two columns, Coffee Reading and Rajab's Mother, in the new period of E’temad Melli Newspaper which brought him a reputation. At the same time, he was the manager of the satire section of Shabnameh, the first daily satire page in Persian press, in E’temad Melli Newspaper.

As a result, his reputation as a satirical columnist was established. Columns such as The Coachman (Canapeh-chi), The Elevatorman (Asansor-chi) and The Adventures of Midoon and Sophia are some of his most popular columns.

In 2000, while he was a junior in high school, Pouria Alami began his official collaboration as a librarian and writer in Gol-Agha Cultural Institute. In the same year, he started his journalistic works in Nourooz Newspaper, Hamshahri Newspaper and Gol-Agha Magazine. His career in this period mainly consisted of writing satirical columns for newspapers and magazines. Some of these columns became so popular that were published as books later on. For a while, he worked as editor of games and designer of table games in Children Gol-Agha Magazine.

During his years of journalistic works, Pouria Alami has also written poetry and fiction. His novel, The Window Dies Sooner, was nominated for Hooshang Golshiri Prize, one of the most prestigious literary prizes in Iran. He has published a number of poetry collections too. A Treaty for Drinking Tea is one of his most famous poetry collections. Nonetheless, most of the books published by Alami are compilations of the satirical columns he had written for various newspapers.

Imprisonment 
In February and March 2013, Alami was arrested by Iran Ministry of Intelligence and imprisoned for 32 days in Evin Prison.

Other activities 
He is currently working as the founder and CEO of two platforms, iGhe3 and Radio Gousheh.

Inaugurated in 2018, iGhe3 is a mobile-based platform for the production of children's stories in Persian language. Alami is both the manager and the writer of the iGhe3 City series in this platform.

References

External links
 iGhe3 official website
 Pouria Alami's arrest

Iranian male short story writers
Iranian writers
Iranian male novelists
Living people
Iranian journalists
1983 births
People from Tehran